Antti Saarela (born June 27, 2001) is a Finnish professional ice hockey winger currently playing for Lukko of the Finnish Liiga. He was drafted 123rd overall by the Chicago Blackhawks in the 2019 NHL Entry Draft.

Playing career
Saarela made his Liiga debut for Lukko, playing one game during the 2017–18 Liiga season. He followed up by playing in twenty-four regular season games for Lukko during the 2018–19 Liiga season, scoring two goals and eight assists for ten points. On April 3, 2019, Saarela signed an optional three-year contract for fellow Liiga club, Ilves.

At the conclusion of his contract with Ilves, Saarela returned to his original club, Lukko, agreeing to a one-year contract on 30 April 2022.

Personal
His father, Pasi Saarela, was a professional hockey player who enjoyed a lengthy career in the SM-liiga, most notably as a star player for local club, Lukko. Antti was also coached through his junior career by Pasi at Lukko. His older brother Aleksi is also a professional hockey player currently playing with the Florida Panthers in the National Hockey League.

Career statistics

Regular season and playoffs

International

References

External links

2001 births
Living people
Chicago Blackhawks draft picks
Finnish ice hockey forwards
Ilves players
People from Laitila
Lukko players
Sportspeople from Southwest Finland